Arja is a Finnish female name and may refer to:

Arja Alho (born 1954), Finnish politician
Arja Hannus, Swedish orienteering competitor
Arja Kajermo, cartoonist, born in Finland, raised in Sweden, currently residing in Ireland
Arja Koriseva (born 1965), award-winning Finnish singer
Arja Nuolioja, Finnish ski-orienteering competitor and world champion
Arja Saijonmaa (born 1944), Finnish singer, political activist and occasional actress
Arja Salafranca (born 1971), South African writer, poet and journalist

Finnish feminine given names